The Olinda Football Club was formed in 1908 and is  based at the Olinda Recreation Reserve, Olinda .

The club is known as"The Bloods" and  wear a white jumper with  a red “vee” and play in the First Division of the Yarra Valley Mountain District Football League.

Premierships 
 
Premierships: 
Seniors: 1910, 1924,1932 1965, 1966, 1967, 1978, 1988, 2005, 2009
Reserves: 2009
Under 18s: 2009,2010

Club History & Results 
Short history
Trevor Billington coached the club to three flags in a row in the  mid-1960s,

VFL/AFL players
Andrew McKinnon: Carlton
Matthew Allan: Carlton, Essendon

References

External links
 Official Site

Australian rules football clubs in Victoria (Australia)
1908 establishments in Australia
Australian rules football clubs established in 1908
Sport in the Shire of Yarra Ranges